Gipping Rural District was a rural district in the county of East Suffolk, England. It was created in 1934 by the merger of the disbanded Bosmere and Claydon Rural District and the disbanded East Stow Rural District, under a County Review Order. It was named after the River Gipping and administered from Needham Market.

Its area was reduced slightly in 1952 by an expansion of the county borough of Ipswich.

On 1 April 1974 it was abolished under the Local Government Act 1972, and has since formed part of the District of Mid Suffolk.

Statistics

Parishes
At the time of its dissolution it consisted of the following 49 civil parishes.

Akenham
Ashbocking
Ashfield cum Thorpe
Badley
Barnham
Barking
Battisford
Baylham
Blakenham Magna
Blakenham Parva
Bramford
Bricett Magna
Buxhall
Claydon
Coddenham
Combs
Creeting St Mary
Creeting St Peter
Crowfield
Debenham
Finborough Magna
Finborough Parva
Flowton
Framsden
Gipping
Gosbeck
Harleston
Haughley
Helmingham
Hemingstone
Henley
Mickfield
Needham Market
Nettlestead
Offton
Old Newton
Onehouse
Pettaugh
Ringshall
Shelland
Somersham
Stonham Aspal
Stonham Earl
Stonham Parva
Stowupland
Wetherden
Whitton
Willisham
Winston

References

History of Suffolk
Districts of England abolished by the Local Government Act 1972